Romeo Chidozie Okwara (born June 17, 1995) is an American football defensive end for the Detroit Lions of the National Football League (NFL). He played college football at Notre Dame and signed with the New York Giants as an undrafted free agent in 2016.

Professional career

New York Giants
Okwara signed with the New York Giants as an undrafted free agent on May 6, 2016. Okwara made his first start replacing Jason Pierre-Paul in a 10-7 victory over the Dallas Cowboys on December 11, 2016.

On October 17, 2017, Okwara was placed on injured reserve with a knee sprain. He was activated off injured reserve to the active roster on December 19, 2017.

On September 4, 2018, Okwara was waived by the Giants.

Detroit Lions
On September 5, 2018, Okwara was claimed off waivers by the Detroit Lions. On October 7, 2018, against the Green Bay Packers, Okwara strip sacked quarterback Aaron Rodgers for a fumble recovery. He played in 15 games with 15 starts, finishing with 39 combined tackles, a team-leading 7.5 sacks, and a forced fumble.

On March 1, 2019, Okwara signed a two-year contract extension with the Lions.

Okwara was placed on the active/non-football injury list at the start of training camp on August 2, 2020. He was activated on August 14, 2020.

In Week 7 of the 2020 season against the Atlanta Falcons, Okwara recorded two sacks on Matt Ryan, including a strip sack which was recovered by the Lions, during the 23–22 win.
In Week 15 against the Tennessee Titans, Okwara recorded a sack on Ryan Tannehill in the endzone for a safety during the 46–25 loss. Okwara had ten sacks for the 2020 season, while the rest of the Lions team only totaled 14.
In Week 17 against the Minnesota Vikings, Okwara recorded his tenth sack of the season on Kirk Cousins during the 37–35 loss.  During the 2020 season, Okwara recorded the same amount of sacks as he did during the rest of his career.

On March 17, 2021, Okwara signed a three-year, $39 million contract extension with the Lions.

On October 5, 2021, Okwara was placed on injured reserve after tearing his Achilles in Week 4.

On August 23, 2022, Okwara was placed on the reserve/PUP list to start the season. He was activated on December 3.

Personal life
Okwara's younger brother Julian Okwara, who also played college football at Notre Dame, also plays for the Detroit Lions.

References

External links
New York Giants bio
Notre Dame Fighting Irish bio

1995 births
Living people
Players of American football from Charlotte, North Carolina
American football defensive ends
Notre Dame Fighting Irish football players
New York Giants players
Detroit Lions players
Nigerian players of American football
Sportspeople from Lagos
Ed Block Courage Award recipients